Bamboos are a diverse group of mostly evergreen perennial flowering plants making up the subfamily Bambusoideae of the grass family Poaceae. Giant bamboos are the largest members of the grass family, in the case of Dendrocalamus sinicus individual culms reaching a length of 151 feet (46 meters), up to fourteen inches (36 centimeters) in thickness and a weight of up to 990 pounds (450 kilograms). The internodes of bamboos can also be of great length. Kinabaluchloa wrayi has internodes up to 8.2 feet (2.5 meters) in length. exceeded in length only by Papyrus.  By contrast, the culms of the tiny bamboo Raddiella vanessiae of the Kaieteur Plateau in French Guiana are only 0.4–0.8 inches (10–20 millimeters) in length by about one-twelfth inch (two millimeters) in width. The origin of the word "bamboo" is uncertain, but it probably comes from the Dutch or Portuguese language, which originally borrowed it from Malay or Kannada.

In bamboo, as in other grasses, the internodal regions of the stem are usually hollow and the vascular bundles in the cross-section are scattered throughout the walls of the culm instead of in a cylindrical cambium layer between the bark (phloem) and the wood (xylem) as in Dicots and Conifers. The dicotyledonous woody xylem is also absent. The absence of secondary growth wood causes the stems of monocots, including the palms and large bamboos, to be columnar rather than tapering.

Bamboos include some of the fastest-growing plants in the world, due to a unique rhizome-dependent system. Certain species of bamboo can grow  within a 24-hour period, at a rate of almost  an hour (equivalent to 1 mm every 90 seconds). Growth up to 47.6 inches (156 centimeters) in 24 hours has been observed in the instance of Japanese giant timber bamboo (Phyllostachys bambusoides). This rapid growth and tolerance for marginal land, make bamboo a good candidate for afforestation, carbon sequestration and climate change mitigation.

Bamboo is versatile and has notable economic and cultural significance in South Asia, Southeast Asia, and East Asia, being used for building materials, as a food source, and as a raw product, and depicted often in arts, such as in bamboo paintings and bambooworking. Bamboo, like wood, is a natural composite material with a high strength-to-weight ratio useful for structures. Bamboo's strength-to-weight ratio is similar to timber, and its strength is generally similar to a strong softwood or hardwood timber. Some bamboos have displayed remarkable strength under test conditions. Bambusa tulda of Bangladesh and adjoining India  has tested as high as 60,000 pounds (27,000 Kg or 27 tonnes) per square inch in tensile strength. Other bamboos have extraordinailly hard wood. Bambusa tabacaria of China contains so much silica that it will make sparks when struck by an axe.

Taxonomy

Bamboos have long been considered the most primitive grasses, mostly because of the presence of bracteate, indeterminate inflorescences, "pseudospikelets", and flowers with three lodicules, six stamens, and three stigmata. Following more recent molecular phylogenetic research, many tribes and genera of grasses formerly included in the Bambusoideae are now classified in other subfamilies, e.g. the Anomochlooideae, the Puelioideae, and the Ehrhartoideae. The subfamily in its current sense belongs to the BOP clade of grasses, where it is sister to the Pooideae (bluegrasses and relatives).

The bamboos comprise three clades classified as tribes, and these strongly correspond with geographic divisions representing the New World herbaceous species (Olyreae), tropical woody bamboos (Bambuseae), and temperate woody bamboos (Arundinarieae). The woody bamboos do not form a monophyletic group; instead, the tropical woody and herbaceous bamboos are sister to the temperate woody bamboos. Altogether, more than 1,400 species are placed in 115 genera.

21 genera:
Subtribe Buergersiochloinae
one genus: Buergersiochloa.
Subtribe Olyrineae
17 genera: Agnesia, Arberella, Cryptochloa, Diandrolyra, Ekmanochloa, Froesiochloa, Lithachne, Maclurolyra, Mniochloa, Olyra, Parodiolyra, Piresiella, Raddia, Raddiella, Rehia, Reitzia (syn. Piresia), Sucrea.
Subtribe Parianinae
three genera: Eremitis, Pariana, Parianella.

73 genera:
 Subtribe Arthrostylidiinae:
15 genera: Actinocladum, Alvimia, Arthrostylidium, Athroostachys, Atractantha, Aulonemia, Cambajuva, Colanthelia, Didymogonyx, Elytrostachys, Filgueirasia, Glaziophyton, Merostachys, Myriocladus, Rhipidocladum.
 Subtribe Bambusinae:
17 genera: Bambusa, Bonia, Cochinchinochloa, Dendrocalamus, Fimbribambusa, Gigantochloa, Maclurochloa, Melocalamus, Neomicrocalamus, Oreobambos, Oxytenanthera, Phuphanochloa, Pseudoxytenanthera, Soejatmia, Thyrsostachys, Vietnamosasa, Yersinochloa.
 Subtribe Chusqueinae:
one genus: Chusquea.
 Subtribe Dinochloinae:
7 genera: Cyrtochloa, Dinochloa, Mullerochloa, Neololeba, Pinga, Parabambusa, Sphaerobambos.
 Subtribe Greslaniinae:
one genus: Greslania.
 Subtribe Guaduinae:
5 genera: Apoclada, Eremocaulon, Guadua, Olmeca, Otatea.
 Subtribe Hickeliinae:
9 genera: Cathariostachys, Decaryochloa, Hickelia, Hitchcockella, Nastus, Perrierbambus, Sirochloa, Sokinochloa, Valiha.
 Subtribe Holttumochloinae:
3 genera: Holttumochloa, Kinabaluchloa, Nianhochloa.
 Subtribe Melocanninae:
9 genera: Annamocalamus, Cephalostachyum, Davidsea, Melocanna, Neohouzeaua, Ochlandra, Pseudostachyum, Schizostachyum, Stapletonia.
 Subtribe Racemobambosinae:
3 genera: Chloothamnus, Racemobambos, Widjajachloa.
 Subtribe Temburongiinae:
one genus: Temburongia.
 incertae sedis
2 genera: Ruhooglandia, Temochloa.

31 genera: Acidosasa, Ampelocalamus, Arundinaria, Bashania, Bergbambos, Chimonobambusa, Chimonocalamus, Drepanostachyum, Fargesia, Ferrocalamus, Gaoligongshania, Gelidocalamus, Himalayacalamus, Indocalamus, Indosasa, Kuruna, Oldeania, Oligostachyum, Phyllostachys, Pleioblastus, Pseudosasa, Sarocalamus, Sasa, Sasaella, Sasamorpha, Semiarundinaria, Shibataea, Sinobambusa, Thamnocalamus, Vietnamocalamus, Yushania.

Distribution

Most bamboo species are native to warm and moist tropical and to warm temperate climates. Their range also extends to cool mountainous regions and highland cloud forests.

In the Asia-Pacific region they occur across East Asia, from north to 50 °N latitude in Sakhalin, to south to northern Australia, and west to India and the Himalayas. China, Japan, Korea, India and Australia, all have several endemic populations. They also occur in small numbers in sub-Saharan Africa, confined to tropical areas, from southern Senegal in the north to southern Mozambique and Madagascar in the south. In the Americas, bamboo has a native range from 47 °S in southern Argentina and the beech forests of central Chile, through the South American tropical rainforests, to the Andes in Ecuador near .

Three species of bamboo, all in the genus Arundinaria, are also native through Central America and Mexico, northward into the Southeastern United States. Bamboo thickets called canebrakes once formed a dominant ecosystem in some parts of the Southeastern United States, but they are now considered critically endangered ecosystems. Canada and continental Europe are not known to have any native species of bamboo. Many species are also cultivated as garden plants outside of this range, including in Europe and areas of North America where no native wild bamboo exists.

Recently, some attempts have been made to grow bamboo on a commercial basis in the Great Lakes region of east-central Africa, especially in Rwanda. In the United States, several companies are growing, harvesting, and distributing species such as Phyllostachys nigra (Henon) and Phyllostachys edulis (Moso).

Ecology

The two general patterns for the growth of bamboo are "clumping", and "running", with short and long underground rhizomes, respectively. Clumping bamboo species tend to spread slowly, as the growth pattern of the rhizomes is to simply expand the root mass gradually, similar to ornamental grasses. Running bamboos need to be controlled during cultivation because of their potential for aggressive behavior. They spread mainly through their rhizomes, which can spread widely underground and send up new culms to break through the surface. Running bamboo species are highly variable in their tendency to spread; this is related to the species, soil and climate conditions. Some send out runners of several meters a year, while others stay in the same general area for long periods. If neglected, over time, they can cause problems by moving into adjacent areas.

Primarily growing in regions of warmer climates during the late Cretaceous period, vast fields existed in what is now Asia. The size range for mature bamboo is species-dependent, with the smallest bamboos reaching only several inches high at maturity. Anji County of China, known as the "Town of Bamboo", provides the optimal climate and soil conditions to grow, harvest, and process some of the most valued bamboo poles available worldwide.

Unlike all trees, individual bamboo culms emerge from the ground at their full diameter and grow to their full height in a single growing season of three to four months. During this time, each new shoot grows vertically into a culm with no branching out until the majority of the mature height is reached. Then, the branches extend from the nodes and leafing out occurs. In the next year, the pulpy wall of each culm slowly hardens. During the third year, the culm hardens further. The shoot is now a fully mature culm. Over the next 2–5 years (depending on species), fungus begins to form on the outside of the culm, which eventually penetrates and overcomes the culm. Around 5–8 years later (species- and climate-dependent), the fungal growths cause the culm to collapse and decay. This brief life means culms are ready for harvest and suitable for use in construction within about three to seven years. Individual bamboo culms do not get any taller or larger in diameter in subsequent years than they do in their first year, and they do not replace any growth lost from pruning or natural breakage. Bamboo has a wide range of hardiness depending on species and locale. Small or young specimens of an individual species produce small culms initially. As the clump and its rhizome system mature, taller and larger culms are produced each year until the plant approaches its particular species limits of height and diameter.

Some of the hardiest bamboo species are grown in USDA plant hardiness zone 5, although they typically defoliate and may even lose all above-ground growth, yet the rhizomes survive and send up shoots again the next spring. In milder climates, such as USDA zone 7 and above, most bamboo remain fully leafed out and green year-round.

Mass flowering 

Bamboos seldom and unpredictably flower and the frequency of flowering varies greatly from species to species. Once flowering takes place, a plant declines and often dies entirely. In fact, many species only flower at intervals as long as 65 or 120 years. These taxa exhibit mass flowering (or gregarious flowering), with all plants in a particular 'cohort' flowering over a several-year period. Any plant derived through clonal propagation from this cohort will also flower regardless of whether it has been planted in a different location. The longest mass flowering interval known is 120 years, and it is for the species Phyllostachys bambusoides (Sieb. & Zucc.). In this species, all plants of the same stock flower at the same time, regardless of differences in geographic locations or climatic conditions, and then the bamboo dies. The commercially important bamboo Guadua, or Cana brava (Guadua angustifolia) bloomed for the first time in recorded history in 1971, suggesting a  blooming interval well in excess of 130 years. The lack of environmental impact on the time of flowering indicates the presence of some sort of "alarm clock" in each cell of the plant which signals the diversion of all energy to flower production and the cessation of vegetative growth. This mechanism, as well as the evolutionary cause behind it, is still largely a mystery.

Invasive species 
Some bamboo species are acknowledged as having high potential for becoming invasive species. A study commissioned by International Bamboo and Rattan Organisation, found that invasive species typically are varieties that spread via rhizomes rather than by clumping, as most commercially viable woody bamboos do. Certain bamboos have become problematic, such as the Phyllostachys species of bamboo which are considered invasive and illegal to sell or propagate in some areas of the US. There are approximately 61 species of Phyllostachys.

Animal diet 

Soft bamboo shoots, stems and leaves are the major food source of the giant panda of China, the red panda of Nepal, and the bamboo lemurs of Madagascar. Rats eat the fruits as described above. Mountain gorillas of Central Africa also feed on bamboo, and have been documented consuming bamboo sap which was fermented and alcoholic; chimpanzees and elephants of the region also eat the stalks. The golden bamboo lemur ingests many times the quantity of the taxiphyllin-containing bamboo that would kill a human.

The larvae of the bamboo borer (the moth Omphisa fuscidentalis) of Laos, Myanmar, Thailand and Yunnan, China feed off the pulp of live bamboo. In turn, these caterpillars are considered a local delicacy.

Cultivation

General

Harvesting

Bamboo used for construction purposes must be harvested when the culms reach their greatest strength and when sugar levels in the sap are at their lowest, as high sugar content increases the ease and rate of pest infestation. As compared to forest trees, bamboo species grow fast. Bamboo plantations can be readily harvested for a shorter period than tree plantations.

Harvesting of bamboo is typically undertaken according to these cycles:

 Lifecycle of the culm: As each individual culm goes through a five to seven-year lifecycle, they are ideally allowed to reach this level of maturity prior to full capacity harvesting. The clearing out or thinning of culms, particularly older decaying culms, helps to ensure adequate light and resources for new growth. Well-maintained clumps may have a productivity three to four times that of an unharvested wild clump. Consistent with the lifecycle described above, bamboo is harvested from two to three years through to five to seven years, depending on the species.
 Annual cycle: As all growth of new bamboo occurs during the wet season, disturbing the clump during this phase will potentially damage the upcoming crop. Also during this high-rainfall period, sap levels are at their highest, and then diminish towards the dry season. Picking immediately prior to the wet/growth season may also damage new shoots. Hence, harvesting is best a few months prior to the start of the wet season.
 Daily cycle: During the height of the day, photosynthesis is at its peak, producing the highest levels of sugar in sap, making this the least ideal time of day to harvest. Many traditional practitioners believe the best time to harvest is at dawn or dusk on a waning moon.

Leaching
Leaching is the removal of sap after harvest. In many areas of the world, the sap levels in harvested bamboo are reduced either through leaching or postharvest photosynthesis.
For example:
 Cut bamboo is raised clear of the ground and leaned against the rest of the clump for one to two weeks until leaves turn yellow to allow full consumption of sugars by the plant.
 A similar method is undertaken, but with the base of the culm standing in fresh water, either in a large drum or stream to leach out sap.
 Cut culms are immersed in a running stream and weighted down for three to four weeks.
 Water is pumped through the freshly cut culms, forcing out the sap (this method is often used in conjunction with the injection of some form of treatment).

In the process of water leaching, the bamboo is dried slowly and evenly in the shade to avoid cracking in the outer skin of the bamboo, thereby reducing opportunities for pest infestation.

Durability of bamboo in construction is directly related to how well it is handled from the moment of planting through harvesting, transportation, storage, design, construction, and maintenance. Bamboo harvested at the correct time of year and then exposed to ground contact or rain will break down just as quickly as incorrectly harvested material.

Toxicity 
Gardeners working with bamboo plants have occasionally reported allergic reactions varying from no effects during previous exposures, to immediate itchiness and rash developing into red welts after several hours where the skin had been in contact with the plant (contact allergy), and in some cases into swollen eyelids and breathing difficulties (dyspnoea). A skin prick test using bamboo extract was positive for the immunoglobulin E (IgE) in an available case study.

The shoots (newly emerged culms) of bamboo contain the toxin taxiphyllin (a cyanogenic glycoside), which produces cyanide in the gut.

Uses

Culinary

The shoots of most species are edible either raw or cooked, with the tough sheath removed. Cooking removes the slight bitterness. The shoots are used in numerous Asian dishes and broths, and are available in supermarkets in various sliced forms, in both fresh and canned versions.

The bamboo shoot in its fermented state forms an important ingredient in cuisines across the Himalayas. In Assam, India, for example, it is called khorisa. In Nepal, a delicacy popular across ethnic boundaries consists of bamboo shoots fermented with turmeric and oil, and cooked with potatoes into a dish that usually accompanies rice ( in Nepali).

In Indonesia, they are sliced thin and then boiled with santan (thick coconut milk) and spices to make a dish called gulai rebung. Other recipes using bamboo shoots are sayur lodeh (mixed vegetables in coconut milk) and lun pia (sometimes written lumpia: fried wrapped bamboo shoots with vegetables). The shoots of some species contain toxins that need to be leached or boiled out before they can be eaten safely.

Pickled bamboo, used as a condiment, may also be made from the pith of the young shoots.

The sap of young stalks tapped during the rainy season may be fermented to make ulanzi (a sweet wine) or simply made into a soft drink. Bamboo leaves are also used as wrappers for steamed dumplings which usually contains glutinous rice and other ingredients, such as the zongzi from China.

Pickled bamboo shoots are cooked with black-eyed beans as a delicacy in Nepal. Many Nepalese restaurants around the world serve this dish as aloo bodi tama. Fresh bamboo shoots are sliced and pickled with mustard seeds and turmeric and kept in glass jar in direct sunlight for the best taste. It is used alongside many dried beans in cooking during winters. Baby shoots (Nepali: tusa) of a very different variety of bamboo native to Nepal is cooked as a curry in hilly regions.

In Sambalpur, India, the tender shoots are grated into juliennes and fermented to prepare kardi. The name is derived from the Sanskrit word for bamboo shoot, karira. This fermented bamboo shoot is used in various culinary preparations, notably amil, a sour vegetable soup. It is also made into pancakes using rice flour as a binding agent. The shoots that have turned a little fibrous are fermented, dried, and ground to sand-sized particles to prepare a garnish known as hendua. It is also cooked with tender pumpkin leaves to make sag green leaves.

In Konkani cuisine, the tender shoots (kirlu) are grated and cooked with crushed jackfruit seeds to prepare kirla sukke.

In southern India and some regions of southwest China, the seeds of the dying bamboo plant are consumed as a grain known as "bamboo rice". The taste of cooked bamboo seeds is reported to be similar to wheat and the appearance similar to rice, but bamboo seeds have been found to have lower nutrient levels than both. The seeds can be pulverized into a flour with which to make cakes.

The Indian state of Sikkim has promoted bamboo water bottles to keep the state free from plastic bottles 

The empty hollow in the stalks of larger bamboo is often used to cook food in many Asian cultures. Soups are boiled and rice is cooked in the hollows of fresh stalks of bamboo directly over a flame. Similarly, steamed tea is sometimes rammed into bamboo hollows to produce compressed forms of pu'er tea. Cooking food in bamboo is said to give the food a subtle but distinctive taste.

Fuel

Working 
Bamboo was used by humans for various purposes from a very early time. Categories of bambooworking include:

Writing surface 

Bamboo was in widespread use in early China as a medium for written documents. The earliest surviving examples of such documents, written in ink on string-bound bundles of bamboo strips (or "slips"), date from the fifth century BC during the Warring States period. References in earlier texts surviving on other media indicate some precursor of these Warring States period bamboo slips was used as early as the late Shang period (from about 1250 BC).

Bamboo or wooden strips were used as the standard writing material during the early Han dynasty, and excavated examples have been found in abundance. Subsequently, paper began to displace bamboo and wooden strips from mainstream uses, and by the fourth century AD, bamboo slips had been largely abandoned as a medium for writing in China.

Bamboo fiber has been used to make paper in China since early times. A high-quality, handmade bamboo paper is still produced in small quantities. Coarse bamboo paper is still used to make spirit money in many Chinese communities.

Bamboo pulps are mainly produced in China, Myanmar, Thailand, and India, and are used in printing and writing papers. Several paper industries are surviving on bamboo forests. Ballarpur (Chandrapur, Maharstra) paper mills use bamboo for paper production. The most common bamboo species used for paper are Dendrocalamus asper and Bambusa blumeana. It is also possible to make dissolving pulp from bamboo. The average fiber length is similar to hardwoods, but the properties of bamboo pulp are closer to softwood pulps due to it having a very broad fiber length distribution. With the help of molecular tools, it is now possible to distinguish the superior fiber-yielding species/varieties even at juvenile stages of their growth, which can help in unadulterated merchandise production.

In Central India, there are regular bamboo working circles in forest areas of Maharashtra, Madhyapradesh, Odisha and Chhattisgarh. Most of the bamboo is harvested for papermaking. Bamboo is cut after three years of its germination. No cutting is done during the rainy season (July–September); broken and malformed culms are harvested first.

Writing pen 

In olden times, people in India used hand-made pens (known as Kalam or boru (बोरू)) made from thin bamboo sticks (with diameters of 5–10 mm and lengths of 100–150 mm) by simply peeling them on one side and making a nib-like pattern at the end. The pen would then be dipped in ink for writing.

Textiles 

Since the fibers of bamboo are very short (less than ), they are not usually transformed into yarn by a natural process. The usual process by which textiles labeled as being made of bamboo are produced uses only rayon made from the fibers with heavy employment of chemicals. To accomplish this, the fibers are broken down with chemicals and extruded through mechanical spinnerets; the chemicals include lye, carbon disulfide, and strong acids. Retailers have sold both end products as "bamboo fabric" to cash in on bamboo's current ecofriendly cachet. The Canadian Competition Bureau and the US Federal Trade Commission, as of mid-2009, are cracking down on the practice of labeling bamboo rayon as natural bamboo fabric. Under the guidelines of both agencies, these products must be labeled as rayon with the optional qualifier "from bamboo".

Fabric

Construction 

Bamboo, like true wood, is a natural building material with a high strength-to-weight ratio useful for structures. In its natural form, bamboo as a construction material is traditionally associated with the cultures of South Asia, East Asia, and the South Pacific, to some extent in Central and South America, and by extension in the aesthetic of Tiki culture.

In China and India, bamboo was used to hold up simple suspension bridges, either by making cables of split bamboo or twisting whole culms of sufficiently pliable bamboo together. One such bridge in the area of Qian-Xian is referenced in writings dating back to 960 AD and may have stood since as far back as the third century BC, due largely to continuous maintenance.

Bamboo has also long been used as scaffolding; the practice has been banned in China for buildings over six stories, but is still in continuous use for skyscrapers in Hong Kong.

In the Philippines, the nipa hut is a fairly typical example of the most basic sort of housing where bamboo is used; the walls are split and woven bamboo, and bamboo slats and poles may be used as its support.

In Japanese architecture, bamboo is used primarily as a supplemental or decorative element in buildings such as fencing, fountains, grates, and gutters, largely due to the ready abundance of quality timber.

Many ethnic groups in remote areas that have water access in Asia use bamboo that is 3–5 years old to make rafts. Once the poles are lined up together, they cut a hole crosswise through the poles at each end and use a small bamboo pole pushed through that hole like a screw to hold all the long bamboo poles together. Floating houses use whole bamboo stalks tied together in a big bunch to support the house floating in the water.

Fishing and aquaculture 

Due to its flexibility, bamboo is also used to make fishing rods. The split cane rod is especially prized for fly fishing.

Firecrackers 
Bamboo has been traditionally used in Malaysia as a firecracker called a meriam buluh or bamboo cannon. Four-foot-long sections of bamboo are cut, and a mixture of water and calcium carbide are introduced. The resulting acetylene gas is ignited with a stick, producing a loud bang.

Weapons 
Bamboo has often been used to construct weapons and is still incorporated in several Asian martial arts.
 A bamboo staff, sometimes with one end sharpened, is used in the Tamil martial art of silambam, a word derived from a term meaning "hill bamboo".
 Staves used in the Indian martial art of gatka are commonly made from bamboo, a material favoured for its light weight.
 A bamboo sword called a shinai is used in the Japanese martial art of kendo.
 Bamboo is used for crafting the bows, called yumi, and arrows used in the Japanese martial art kyūdō.
 The first gunpowder-based weapons, such as the fire lance, were made of bamboo.
 Sharpened bamboo javelins weighted with sand known as bagakay were used as disposable missile weapons in both land and naval warfare in the Philippines. They were thrown in groups at a time at enemy ships or massed enemy formations. Non-disposable finely-crafted throwing spears made from bamboo weighted with sand known as sugob were also used. Sugob were mainly used for close-quarters combat and were only thrown when they could be retrieved.
Metal-tipped blowgun-spears called sumpit (or sumpitan), used by various ethnic groups in the islands of the Philippines, Borneo, and Sulawesi, were generally made from hollowed bamboo. They used thick short darts dipped in the concentrated sap of Antiaris toxicaria which could cause lethal cardiac arrest.

Desalination 
Bamboo can be used in water desalination. A bamboo filter is used to remove the salt from seawater.

Musical instruments

Indicator of climate change 
The Song dynasty (960–1279 AD) Chinese scientist and polymath Shen Kuo (1031–1095) used the evidence of underground petrified bamboo found in the dry northern climate of Yan'an, Shanbei region, Shaanxi province to support his geological theory of gradual climate change.

Kitchenware and other usage 

Bamboo is frequently used for cooking utensils within many cultures, and is used in the manufacture of chopsticks. In modern times, some see bamboo tools as an eco-friendly alternative to other manufactured utensils.

Bamboo is also used to make eating utensils such as chopsticks, trays, and tea scoops. Several manufacturers offer bamboo bicycles, surfboards, snowboards, and skateboards.

Bamboo has traditionally been used to make a wide range of everyday utensils and cutting boards, particularly in Japan, where archaeological excavations have uncovered bamboo baskets dating to the Late Jōmon period (2000–1000 BC).

Bamboo has a long history of use in Asian furniture. Chinese bamboo furniture is a distinct style based on a millennia-long tradition, and bamboo is also used for floors due to its high hardness.

In culture
Several Asian cultures, including that of the Andaman Islands, believe humanity emerged from a bamboo stem.

China 

Bamboo's long life makes it a Chinese symbol of uprightness and an Indian symbol of friendship. The rarity of its blossoming has led to the flowers' being regarded as a sign of impending famine. This may be due to rats feeding upon the profusion of flowers, then multiplying and destroying a large part of the local food supply. The most recent flowering began in May 2006 (see Mautam). Various bamboo species bloom in this manner about every 28–60 years.

In Chinese culture, the bamboo, plum blossom, orchid, and chrysanthemum (often known as méi lán zhú jú  in Chinese) are collectively referred to as the Four Gentlemen. These four plants also represent the four seasons and, in Confucian ideology, four aspects of the junzi ("prince" or "noble one"). The pine (sōng ), the bamboo (zhú ), and the plum blossom (méi ) are also admired for their perseverance under harsh conditions, and are together known as the "Three Friends of Winter" in Chinese culture.

Attributions of character 

Bamboo, one of the "Four Gentlemen" (bamboo, orchid, plum blossom and chrysanthemum), plays such an important role in traditional Chinese culture that it is even regarded as a behavior model of the gentleman. As bamboo has features such as uprightness, tenacity, and modesty, people endow bamboo with integrity, elegance, and plainness, though it is not physically strong. Countless poems praising bamboo written by ancient Chinese poets are actually metaphorically about people who exhibited these characteristics. An ancient poet, Bai Juyi (772–846), thought that to be a gentleman, a man does not need to be physically strong, but he must be mentally strong, upright, and perseverant. Just as a bamboo is hollow-hearted, he should open his heart to accept anything of benefit and never have arrogance or prejudice.

Bamboo is not only a symbol of a gentleman, but also plays an important role in Buddhism, which was introduced into China in the first century. As canons of Buddhism forbids cruelty to animals, flesh and egg were not allowed in the diet. The tender bamboo shoot (sǔn  in Chinese) thus became a nutritious alternative. Preparation methods developed over thousands of years have come to be incorporated into Asian cuisines, especially for monks. A Buddhist monk, Zan Ning, wrote a manual of the bamboo shoot called Sǔn Pǔ offering descriptions and recipes for many kinds of bamboo shoots. Bamboo shoot has always been a traditional dish on the Chinese dinner table, especially in southern China.
In ancient times, those who could afford a big house with a yard would plant bamboo in their garden.

Mythology 
In a Chinese legend, the Emperor Yao gave two of his daughters to the future Emperor Shun as a test for his potential to rule. Shun passed the test of being able to run his household with the two emperor's daughters as wives, and thus Yao made Shun his successor, bypassing his unworthy son. After Shun's death, the tears of his two bereaved wives fell upon the bamboos growing there explains the origin of spotted bamboo. The two women later became goddesses Xiangshuishen after drowning themselves in the Xiang River.

Japan 

Bamboo is a symbol of prosperity in Japan, and are used to make New Year's decorations called kadomatsu. Bamboo forests sometimes surround Shinto shrines and Buddhist temples as part of a sacred barrier against evil. In the folktale Tale of the Bamboo Cutter (Taketori Monogatari), princess Kaguya emerges from a shining bamboo section.

In Japan, the Chinese "Three Friends of Winter" (kansai sanyū) concept is traditionally used as a ranking system, where pine ( matsu) is the first rank, bamboo ( take) is the second rank, and plum ( ume) is the third rank. This system is used in many traditional arts like with sushi sets, embroidering kimono or tiers of accommodations at traditional ryōkan taverns.

Malaysia 
In Malaysia, a similar story includes a man who dreams of a beautiful woman while sleeping under a bamboo plant; he wakes up and breaks the bamboo stem, discovering the woman inside.

Philippines 
In Philippine mythology, one of the more famous creation accounts tells of the first man Malakás ("Strong") and the first woman Maganda ("Beautiful") each emerging from one half of a split bamboo stem on an island formed after the battle between Sky and Ocean.

Vietnam

Attributions of character 
Bamboo plays an important part of the culture of Vietnam. Bamboo symbolizes the spirit of Vovinam (a Vietnamese martial arts): cương nhu phối triển (coordination between hard and soft (martial arts)). Bamboo also symbolizes the Vietnamese hometown and Vietnamese soul: the gentlemanlike, straightforwardness, hard working, optimism, unity, and adaptability. A Vietnamese proverb says, "Tre già, măng mọc" (When the bamboo is old, the bamboo sprouts appear), the meaning being Vietnam will never be annihilated; if the previous generation dies, the children take their place. Therefore, the Vietnam nation and Vietnamese value will be maintained and developed eternally. Traditional Vietnamese villages are surrounded by thick bamboo hedges (lũy tre).

During Ngô Đình Diệm's presidency, bamboo was the national symbol of South Vietnam, it was featured on the national coat of arms, presidential standard, and South Vietnamese đồng coins at the time.

Mythology 
A bamboo cane is also the weapon of Vietnamese legendary hero, Thánh Gióng, who had grown up immediately and magically since the age of three because of his wish to liberate his land from Ân invaders. The ancient Vietnamese legend Cây tre trăm đốt (The Hundred-knot Bamboo Tree) tells of a poor, young farmer who fell in love with his landlord's beautiful daughter. The farmer asked the landlord for his daughter's hand in marriage, but the proud landlord would not allow her to be bound in marriage to a poor farmer. The landlord decided to foil the marriage with an impossible deal; the farmer must bring him a "bamboo tree of 100 nodes". But Gautama Buddha (Bụt) appeared to the farmer and told him that such a tree could be made from 100 nodes from several different trees. Bụt gave to him four magic words to attach the many nodes of bamboo: Khắc nhập, khắc xuất, which means "joined together immediately, fell apart immediately". The triumphant farmer returned to the landlord and demanded his daughter. Curious to see such a long bamboo, the landlord was magically joined to the bamboo when he touched it, as the young farmer said the first two magic words. The story ends with the happy marriage of the farmer and the landlord's daughter after the landlord agreed to the marriage and asked to be separated from the bamboo.

Africa

Bozo 
The Bozo ethnic group of West Africa take their name from the Bambara phrase bo-so, which means "bamboo house".

Saint Lucia 
Bamboo is also the national plant of St. Lucia.

Hawaiian 
Hawaiian bamboo ('ohe) is a kinolau or body form of the Polynesian creator god Kāne.

North America
Arundinaria bamboos, known as giant cane or river cane, are a central part of the material cultures of Southeastern Native American nations, so much so that they have been called "the plastic of the Southeastern Indians." Among the Cherokee, river cane has been used to make waterproof baskets, mats, fishing poles, flutes, blowguns, arrows, and to build houses, among other uses; the seed and young shoots are also edible.

See also
 Bamboo blossom
 Bamboo processing machine
 Bamboo torture
 Bambuseae
 Ceremonial pole
 Domesticated plants and animals of Austronesia
 International Network for Bamboo and Rattan
 List of bamboo species
 Mautam
 Plant textiles
Table of Wood and Bamboo Mechanical and Agricultural Properties
 Xiangshuishen (Xiang River goddesses)

References

Further reading 
Bamboo – The Plant and its Uses. Part of the Tropical Forestry book series (TROPICAL, volume 10), 2015.

External links

Bamboo for Climate Change by INBAR.
 
 Bamboo Structural Design ISO Standards

 
 
Building materials
Bamboo
Bamboo
Bamboo
Bamboo
Bamboo
National symbols of Saint Lucia
National symbols of Japan
National symbols of China
Rhizomatous plants
Stem vegetables